The 2016 Wellington local elections were part of the wider 2016 New Zealand local elections, to elect members to sub-national councils and boards. The Wellington elections cover one regional council (the Greater Wellington Regional Council), eight territorial authorities (city and district councils), three district health boards, and various community boards and licensing trusts.

Greater Wellington Regional Council

Wellington constituency (5)
Incumbent councillor Judith Aitken did not seek re-election. Incumbents Sue Kedgley, Chris Laidlaw and Daran Ponter were re-elected, joined by former Wellington City deputy mayor Ian McKinnon and Roger Blakeley. Incumbent Paul Bruce was defeated.

Lower Hutt constituency (3)
Incumbent councillors Ken Laban and Prue Lamason were re-elected, while David Ogden defeated incumbent councillor Sandra Greig.

Porirua-Tawa constituency (2)
Incumbent councillors Jenny Brash and Barbra Donaldson were re-elected.

Kapiti Coast constituency (1)
Retiring Kapiti Coast District Council councillor Penny Gaylor was elected, defeating incumbent councillor Nigel Wilson.

Upper Hutt constituency (1)
Incumbent councillor Paul Swain was elected unopposed.

Wairarapa constituency (1)
The Wairarapa constituency was vacant following the death of councillor Gary McPhee in June 2016. Retiring South Wairarapa mayor Adrienne Staples was elected.

Kapiti Coast District Council

Mayor

Angela Buswell
Ross Church
Jackie Elliott (Independent)
K Gurunathan
David Scott
Gavin Welsh

Councillors – at large (5)

Ric Austin
Murray Bell
Emily Boonen
Angela Buswell
Mike Cardiff
Jackie Elliott
Peter Ellis
Anne-Maree Ellison
Eric Gregory
K Gurunathan
John Howson
Christopher Ruthe
David Scott
Shelly Warwick

Councillors – Paraparaumu ward (2)

Mark Benton
Martin Halliday
Bernie Randall
Kathy Spiers
Fiona Vining

Councillors – Ōtaki ward (1)
James Cootes was elected unopposed.

Councillors – Waikanae ward (1)

Geoffrey Churchman
Iride McCloy
Tim Parry
Michael Scott

Councillors – Paekakāriki-Raumati ward (1)
Guy Burns
Janet Holborow

Porirua City Council

Mayor
Incumbent Nick Leggett did not seek re-election, instead seeking election as mayor of the Wellington City Council.

Mike Duncan (Independent)
Liz Kelly (Independent)
Gordon Marshall
Euon Murrell
Mike Tana (Independent)
David Watt (Grow Porirua, not the council)

Councillors – Northern ward (4)

Anita Baker
Don Casagranda (Independent)
Brian Collins
Phil Dyer (Independent)
Dianne Khan
Ross Leggett
Keryn Martin
Barry McEwen (Independent)
Sarah Piper (Independent)
Nathan Waddle
Beverley Wakem
Andrew Wellum
Dale Williams

Councillors – Eastern ward (4)

John Burke
Morris Cheer
Izzy Ford
Jevan Goulter (Make Porirua great again)
Martin Gregory (Independent Socialist)
Lorna Kanavatoa
Denys Latham (Independent)
Paula Mac Ewan (Independent)
Sala Nimarota
Faafoi Seiuli
Benna Seveali'i Siolo
Willie Taurima
David Watt (Grow Porirua, not the council)
Kylie Wihapi

Councillors – Western ward (2)

Chantelle Anslow
Ana Coffey (Independent)
Zahi Dodson (Independent)
Mike Duncan (Independent)
Graeme Ebbett (Independent)
T J Fermanis (Independent)
Jude Pointon (Independent)
Henry Smith (Independent)
Chris Wilson (Independent)
Ranei Wineera-Parai (Our City, Our Home, Our Future)

Upper Hutt City Council

Mayor
Incumbent mayor Wayne Guppy was re-elected.

Councillors (10)

Vicki Amai-Waiwai (Independent)
Michael Anderson (Independent)
Michael Baines
Chris Carson 
Ros Connelly
Karen de Wit 
Blair Griffiths
John Gwilliam
Alan Jefferies (Independent)
Harry Kent (Independent)
Paul Lambert (Independent)
Nigel Mander (A friend you can trust)
Glenn McArthur (Independent)
Angela McLeod (Independent)
Rob Rangi (Independent)
Adrian Sparrow
Hellen Swales (Independent)
Steve Taylor
Tracey Ultra (Independent)
Dave Wheeler

Hutt City Council

Mayor
Incumbent mayor Ray Wallace was re-elected.

Councillors – Northern ward (2)
The Northern ward covers the suburbs of Stokes Valley and Taita.

Fred Allen (Team Fred Allen)
Dina Awarau (Labour)
Tania Karaitiana-Ugone (Independent)
Gwen McDonald (Independent)
Leigh Sutton (Independent)

Councillors – Western ward (2)
The Western ward includes the suburbs of Haywards, Manor Park, Kelson, Belmont, Tirohanga, Harbour View, Melling, Normandale, Maungaraki and Alicetown.

Margaret Cousins (Independent)
Karim Dickie (Independent)
Chris Milne (The Man with a Plan)
Max Shierlaw (Independent)
Joy Skye
Lynette Vigrass (Independent)

Councillors – Central ward (2)
The Central ward includes the suburbs of Avalon, Boulcott, Epuni, Lower Hutt Central and Woburn.

David Bassett (Independent)
Simon Edwards (Independent)
Mark Leicester (Independent)

Councillors – Eastern ward (2)
The Eastern ward covers the suburbs of Naenae,  Fairfield, Waterloo and Waiwhetū (north of Whites Line)

Glenda Barratt (Independent)
Lisa Bridson (Green)
Roger Styles (Independent)

Councillors – Harbour ward (2)
The Harbour ward covers the suburbs of Korokoro, Petone,  Waiwhetū (south of Whites Line), Moera, Gracefield, Seaview, Point Howard, Sorrento Bay, Lowry Bay, York Bay, Mahina Bay, Sunshine Bay, Days Bay and Eastbourne.

Mason Branch (Independent)
Brady Dyer (Independent)
Mike Fisher (Independent)
Tui Lewis (Independent)
Michael Lulich (Independent)

Councillors – Wainuiomata ward (2)
The Wainuiomata ward covers the town of Wainuiomata.

Campbell Barry (Independent)
Josh Briggs (Independent)
Leah Clark
Kia Houpapa (Independent Maori)
Margaret Willard (Independent)

Wellington City Council

Mayor

Incumbent mayor Celia Wade-Brown did not seek re-election

Councillors – Eastern ward
The Eastern ward returns three councillors to the Wellington City Council. The final iteration of results for the ward were:

Councillors – Lambton ward
The Lambton ward returns three councillors to the Wellington City Council. The final iteration of results for the ward were:

Councillors – Northern ward
The Northern ward returns three councillors to the Wellington City Council. The final iteration of results for the ward were:

Councillors – Onslow-Western ward
The Onslow-Western ward returns three councillors to the Wellington City Council. The final iteration of results for the ward were:

Councillors – Southern ward
The Southern ward returns two councillors to the Wellington City Council. The final iteration of results for the ward were:

Masterton District Council

Mayor
Incumbent mayor Lyn Patterson was elected unopposed.

Councillors – at large (5)

John Dalziell
Deborah Davidson
Siobhan Garlick
Jonathan Hooker
Keith Hunt
Frazer Mailman 
Tina Nixon (Working for Masterton)
Chris Peterson
Ian Steer (Independent)
Jennifer Taylor

Councillors – Urban ward (4)
The urban ward covers the Masterton township.

Gary Caffell
Brent Goodwin (Fighting for the Ratepayers)
Mark Harris (Working for Growth and Development)
Rebecca (Bex) Johnson
Donna Laing (Our Families, Our Future)
Simon (Ziggy) O'Donoghue

Councillors – Rural ward (1)
The rural ward covers the entire Masterton district outside Masterton township.
Ross Cottle (Independent)
Graham McClymont

Carterton District Council

Mayor
Incumbent mayor John Booth was re-elected.

Councillors (8)

Mike Ashby
Kathy Bartlett
Ruth Carter
Brian Deller
Don Farr
Sandy Garrett
Jill Greathead
Rob Harris
Russell Keys
Greg Lang
Tracey O'Callaghan
Mike Osborne
Mike Palmers
Ron Shaw
Rebecca Vergunst
Leah Wynne

South Wairarapa District Council

Mayor
Incumbent mayor Adrienne Staples did not seek re-election, instead seeking election as the Wairarapa constituency councillor on the Greater Wellington Regional Council. Greytown ward councillor and deputy mayor Viv Napier was elected.

Councillors – Greytown ward (3)
The Marlborough ward includes the town of Greytown and the surrounding rural areas, bounded in the south and east by the Tauherenikau River, State Highway 53 and the Ruamahanga River.

Paora Ammunson (Independent)
Margaret Craig 
Dean Davies
John Gilberthorpe
Mike Gray
Viv Napier
Jerry Steer
Colin Wright

Councillors – Featherston ward (3)
The Marlborough ward includes the town of Featherston and the surrounding rural areas, bounded in the north and east by the Tauherenikau River, State Highway 53 and the Ruamahanga River.

Perry Cameron
Lee Carter (Caring for our community)
Dayle Harwood (Independent)
Pete Love
Colin Olds
Robyn Ramsden
Pete Roberts (Independent)

Councillors – Martinborough ward (3)
The Marlborough ward includes the town of Martinborough and the surrounding rural areas, bounded in the west by the Ruamahanga River.

Alice Arndell 
Pam Colenso
Martin Freeth
Graham Higginson (Independent)
Robert Hunter
Brian Jephson
Pip Maynard
Terry Te Maari
Mary Tipoki
Alex Wall (Independent)
Greg Whitten

References

Wellington
Politics of the Wellington Region
Wellington
2010s in Wellington